Podocarpus rusbyi is a species of conifer in the family Podocarpaceae. It is found only in Bolivia.

References

rusbyi
Data deficient plants
Taxonomy articles created by Polbot